Kezhemsky is a rural locality (a settlement) in Bratsky District of Irkutsk Oblast, Russia.

References

Rural localities in Irkutsk Oblast